The men's triple jump event  at the 1990 European Athletics Indoor Championships was held in Kelvin Hall on 4 March.

Results

References

Triple jump at the European Athletics Indoor Championships
Triple